The Saskatoon/St. Paul Regals were an ice hockey team in the Western Hockey League that existed for one season in 1957–58. The franchise split its home games between Saskatoon, Saskatchewan,  Canada and St. Paul, Minnesota, United States.

The Regals moved to Saskatoon/St. Paul two seasons after being formed as the Brandon Regals. As the two city experiment failed, the Regals became the second incarnation of the Saskatoon Quakers for the 1958–59 season before folding altogether. The Regals/Quakers franchise was the last professional hockey team in Saskatchewan.

Season-by-season record
Note: GP = Games played, W = Wins, L = Losses, T = Ties Pts = Points, GF = Goals for, GA = Goals against

See also
List of ice hockey teams in Saskatchewan

References
hockeyleaguehistory.com WCSHL standings
The Old Western Hockey League PCHL/WHL standings
hockeydb.com

Defunct ice hockey teams in Saskatchewan
Sport in Saskatoon
Ice hockey clubs established in 1957
Ice hockey clubs disestablished in 1958
Sports in Saint Paul, Minnesota
Western Hockey League (1952–1974) teams